Multilateral Debt Relief Initiative (MDRI) was approved on June, 2005, by the finance ministers of the G8 during the 31st G8 Summit, held at Gleneagles, Scotland. MDRI is different to HIPC, but operationally related. Countries in the termination point get full relief of their debt with IMF, International Development Association (IDA) and the African Development Bank (AfDB). MDRI was approved for encouraging debtor countries to continue their political reforms. For reasons of equal treatment of Low Income Countries (LIC) the relieved debts were counted when new ancillary remedies were guaranteed by IDA and AfDB. G8 members committed themselves to compensate IDA and AfDB refluxes with further remedies. These compensations will be shared among IDA and AfDB beneficiary countries according to the efforts they make (performance based allocation).

How does MDRI work
IMF, IDA and AfDB fully relieve the debt of countries which attain (after complying with specific conditions that are detailed in HIPC page) termination point — the step where a country is eligible to receive total and irrevocable relief of its debt— in HIPC's frame.

The difference with HIPC consists of MDRI not covering all creditors, only  IMF, IDA and AfDB. Besides, under MDRI, IMF also provided debt relief to non-HIPC countries whose per capita income did not exceed $380  and were indebted with IMF until the end of 2004. Thus a uniform treatment in IMF resources management is guaranteed.

Cost
Total debt relief provided by IMF through MDRI lied around US$3.4 billion, in nominal terms. Besides IMF granted Liberia a debt relief of US$172 million as June, 30th 2010. "26 HIPC countries that had reached the completion point as of June 2009 will receive $29 billion (in end-2008 net present value terms) in debt relief under the MDRI." As February 2, 2015, no pending debt rested eligible for MDRI, so its bills were liquidated and the remnants were transferred to the Disaster Relief and Contention Trust Fund.

Countries participating in MDRI
Thirty-seven countries have benefited from MDRI: Afghanistan, Benin, Bolivia, Burkina Faso, Burundi, Cambodia, Cameroon, Comores, Ivory Coast, Ethiopia, Gambia, Ghana, Guinea, Guinea-Bissau, Guyana, Haiti, Honduras, Liberia, Madagascar, Malawi, Mali, Mauritania, Mozambique, Nicaragua, Niger, Central African Republic, Republic of the Congo, Democratic Republic of the Congo, Rwanda, São Tomé and Príncipe, Senegal, Sierra Leona, Tanzania, Tajikistan, Togo, Uganda and Zambia.

See also
 Debt relief
 Odious debt
 Public debt
 Heavily indebted poor countries (HIPC)
 Millennium Development Goals

References

Economic development programs
Third World debt cancellation activism
Measurements and definitions of poverty
Economic country classifications